Still in Your Dreams is the fifty-third studio album by American country music singer Conway Twitty. The album was released in 1988, by MCA Records.

Track listing

Personnel
Eddie Bayers - drums
Richard Bennett - acoustic guitar
Vince Gill - background vocals
David Hungate - bass guitar
Mike Lawler - organ, synthesizer
Matt Rollings - DX-7, piano
Conway Twitty - lead vocals
Reggie Young - electric guitar

Charts

References

1988 albums
Conway Twitty albums
MCA Records albums
Albums produced by Jimmy Bowen